Qing County or Qingxian, or Qingxian, is a county in the east of Hebei province, China, bordering Tianjin to the north. G2 Beijing–Shanghai Expressway, which is concurrent with G3 Beijing–Taipei Expressway in the province, as well as China National Highway 104, pass through the county.

Administrative divisions
The county administers 6 towns and 4 townships.

Towns:
Qingzhou, Jinniu, Xinxing, Liuhe, Mumendian, Machang

Townships:
Zhouguantun Township, Caosi Township, Pangu Township, Chenzui Township

Climate

References

External links

 
County-level divisions of Hebei
Cangzhou